My Funniest Year is a British television stand-up comedy series broadcast on Channel 4. In each episode a comedian talks about the events of one particular year during his life.

Episode list

External links 

2010 British television series debuts
2011 British television series endings
British stand-up comedy television series
Channel 4 comedy